The Chinese Ice Hockey Championship is the national ice hockey championship in China. It was founded in 1953. It is made up solely of amateur teams. A number of professional Chinese teams have participated in Asia League Ice Hockey, the most recent one being China Dragon from 2008 until 2017. In 2016, Kunlun Red Star was founded and joined the Kontinental Hockey League as an expansion team.

Champions
2018: Qiqihar
2017: Qiqihar 1
2016: Unknown
2015: Qiqihar 1
2014: Harbin
2013: Qiqihar 1
2012: Qiqihar
2011: Harbin
2010: Qiqihar
2009: Qiqihar
2008: Qiqihar
2007: Harbin
2006: Qiqihar
2005: Qiqihar
2004: Qiqihar
2003: Harbin 
2002: Harbin
2001: Qiqihar
2000: Qiqihar
1999: Harbin
1998: Qiqihar 
1997: Qiqihar 
1996: Qiqihar
1995: Qiqihar
1994: Qiqihar
1993: Qiqihar
1992: Not contested
1991: Nei Menggol
1990: Not contested
1989: Harbin
1988: Changchun
1986: Harbin
1984: Harbin
1983: Jiamusi
1979: Qiqihar
1977: Harbin
1976: Harbin
1975: Harbin
1974: Tsitsikhar
1973: Harbin
1972: Heilungkiang
1963-1971: Not contested/Unknown
1962: Qiqihar

Sources:

References

Ice hockey competitions in China
Ice hockey leagues in Asia